Jean Lawless (born c. 1930) is an Irish badminton player.

Biography
Jean Lawless first became national champion in Ireland in 1952. Five more titles followed until 1958. In 1952 she won the women's doubles and women's singles at the Irish Open. Her married name is Jean Sharkey.

Achievements

References

1930s births
Living people
Irish female badminton players